Cyril Frederick Scurr  (1920–2012) was dean of the Royal College of Anaesthetists.

He is buried at St Andrew's church, Totteridge, London.

References 

1920 births
2012 deaths
St Andrew's church, Totteridge
People from Hampstead
Royal Army Medical Corps officers
British anaesthetists
Deans of the Royal College of Anaesthetists
Commanders of the Order of the British Empire
Lieutenants of the Royal Victorian Order
Presidents of the Association of Anaesthetists